Styela plicata, commonly known as pleated sea squirt, is a species of tunicate in the family Styelidae. This sessile filter feeder can expel water when threatened.

Description
This invasive species is Florida's largest tunicate.

Distribution
The range of Styela plicata has greatly expanded due to its ability to hitch a ride on ships' hulls. Preventative measures include anti-fouling paints, wood preservation, and slime control containing tributyltin.

Habitat
This species can live in a wide range of conditions, in waters from 10° to 30°C and salinities between 22%-34% (Thiyagarajan & Qian, 2003) as well as pollution and brackish water. The different life cycle stages of Styela plicata have different habitat requirements for survival. The larval and juvenile stages of Styela plicata live on marinas and docks, oyster reefs, rocks and coarse woody debris: adults prefer marinas, docks and hard rocky substrates. Styela plicata can also live in coral reef habitats, and is found from the low intertidal zone to depths of 30 metres.

References

Stolidobranchia
Animals described in 1823